The 2011 Copa Libertadores de América (officially the 2011 Copa Santander Libertadores de América for sponsorship reasons) was the 52nd edition of the Copa Libertadores de América, South America's premier international club football tournament organized by CONMEBOL. It was held from January 25 to June 22 of the same year. Brazilian club Internacional were the defending champion, but they were eliminated by Uruguayan team Peñarol in the round of 16. Internacional was succeeded by Brazilian club Santos, who won their third title after defeating Peñarol in the two-legged finals.
Santos qualified to the 2011 FIFA Club World Cup and the 2012 Recopa Sudamericana.

Qualified teams
Starting from 2011, the most recent Copa Sudamericana champion would earn a berth in the tournament. However, the country of the Copa Sudamericana champion would not gain an extra berth. The Copa Sudamericana champion would take the lowest-placed berth already assigned to the country if they did not qualify for the Copa Libertadores through domestic performance.

Draw
The draw for the 2011 Copa Libertadores was held on November 25, 2010, in Asunción. The drawing procedure for the 12 teams in the first stage was to alternatively draw a team from each pot. The drawing procedure for the 26 teams in the second stage was to draw out the pots beginning with Pot 1. One team from each pot would be placed, in the order of being drawn, into one of eight groups from 1 to 8. When drawing from Pot 3, if a team had been placed in a group where a team from the same football association was already placed, they were moved to the subsequent group until they were no longer in a group with a team from the same association. However, a first stage winner may be drawn with a team from the same association in the second stage.

For the first time, the seeded teams for the second stage were changed. Up until 2010, the 8 seeded teams included the reigning champion, and clubs from the football associations of Argentina and Brazil. For 2011, the seeded teams consisted of berths 1 from Argentina, Brazil, Colombia, Ecuador, Peru and Venezuela, and berths 2 from Argentina and Brazil. The reigning champion–Internacional–was berth 1 for Brazil. For 2012, Bolivia, Chile, Paraguay and Uruguay would all have their berth 1 teams be seeded teams instead of the berth 1 teams from Colombia, Ecuador, Peru and Venezuela.

Prior to the draw, it was announced that Caracas would be one of the eight seeded teams. During the draw, however, Deportivo Táchira was accidentally drawn as the seeded team for Group 4 and Caracas was drawn into Group 5 as a non-seeded team. After the ceremony, CONMEBOL recognized their error and transferred Caracas over to Group 4 and Deportivo Táchira over to Group 5.

1Teams had not yet fully qualified to the specific berth when the draw took place.

Schedule
All dates listed are Wednesdays, but matches may be played on the day before (Tuesdays) and after (Thursdays) as well.

First stage

The First Stage began on January 25 and ended on February 3. Team 1 played the second leg at home.

Second stage

The Second Stage, played in home-and-away round-robin format, began on February 9 and ended on April 20. The top two teams from each group qualified for the knockout stages.

Group 1

Group 2

Group 3

Group 4

Group 5

Group 6

Group 7

Group 8

Knockout stages

The last four stages of the tournament (round of 16, quarter-finals, semi-finals, and finals), played in home-and-away two-legged format, form a single-elimination tournament, contested by the sixteen teams which advance from the Second Stage. In each tie, the team with the higher seed will play at home in the second leg.

Seeding
The 16 qualified teams are seeded in the knockout stages according to their results in the second stage, with the group winners seeded 1–8, and the group runners-up seeded 9–16. The teams were ranked by: 1. Points (Pts); 2. Goal difference (GD); 3. Goals scored (GF); 4. Away goals (AG); 5. Drawing of lots.

Bracket

Round of 16
The Round of 16 began on April 26 and ended on May 5. Team 1 played the second leg at home.

Quarter-finals
The Quarterfinals began on May 11 and ended on May 19. Team 1 played the second leg at home.

Semi-finals
The Semi-finals began on May 25 and ended on June 2. Team 1 played the second leg at home.

Finals

The Finals were played over two legs, with the higher-seeded team playing the second leg at home. If the teams were tied on points and goal difference at the end of regulation in the second leg, the away goals rule would not be applied and 30 minutes of extra time would be played. If still tied after extra time, the title would be decided by penalty shootout.

Santos won on points 4–1.

Top goalscorers

Awards

Player of the week

See also
2011 FIFA Club World Cup
2011 Copa Sudamericana
2012 Recopa Sudamericana
2011 U-20 Copa Libertadores

References

External links
Official webpage  

 
2011
1